The Journal of Sports Economics is a peer-reviewed academic journal published by SAGE Publications in association with the North American Association of Sports Economists covering the economics of sports. It was established by economist Leo "Harold" Kahane in 2000. The editor-in-chief is Dennis Coates (University of Maryland, Baltimore).

Abstracting and indexing 
The journal is abstracted and indexed in Scopus and the Social Sciences Citation Index. According to the Journal Citation Reports, the journal has a 2017 impact factor of 1.107.

References

External links 
 

SAGE Publishing academic journals
English-language journals
Economics journals
Bimonthly journals
Publications established in 2000
8 times per year journals